The High Speed Scene is the self-titled second EP by Power pop band The High Speed Scene.  It was released on November 16, 2004 by Interscope Records.

Track listing
The I Roc Z Song (3:22)
For the Kids (2:12)
Switch it (demo) (3:31)

External links
A review of the album

The High Speed Scene albums
2004 EPs